Neevevaro is a 2018 Telugu language romantic action thriller film directed by Hari Nath and produced by Kona Venkat and M.V.V. Satyanarayana. The film stars Aadhi, Taapsee Pannu and Ritika Singh. This film is a remake of 2017 Tamil film, Adhe Kangal, directed by Rohin Venkatesan.

Plot

Kalyan (Aadhi Pinisetty), a blind chef, owns a restaurant in Hyderabad and is very successful. He has a loving family and is well-respected by his workers. His childhood friend and neighbor Anu (Ritika Singh) is in love with him. His routine includes spending time in his restaurant playing the guitar after it closes and taking a walk back to his house. One night while he is about to close up and leave, Vennela (Taapsee Pannu) shows up in the restaurant requesting to help feed a homeless person. Kalyan is impressed with her in their first meeting. Vennela visits his restaurant regularly for the same reason, and Kalyan gradually falls in love with her. He proposes to her one day, but to his shock, Vennela cries upon hearing his proposal, saying that she loves him too, but she came here to bid farewell. Vennela says she borrowed two million rupees from a gang a few years ago for her father's heart surgery, and now she cannot repay it. The gang has threatened her family several times, and warned her they would abduct her if she cannot repay her debt the next day. Kalyan, who is in love with Vennela, agrees to repay her debt.

On his way home the very night, Kalyan encounters a car accident which makes him unconscious for three weeks, but also coincidentally, returns his sight. Waking up, Kalyan is shocked to learn that three weeks have passed, which means Vennela could be in danger. He starts to look for her through clues she left while with him, but ends up finding nothing. Meanwhile, Kalyan and Anu's parents want the two to marry each other. To please his mother, Kalyan agrees to marry Anu, though he loves Vennela. The night before Kalyan and Anu's wedding, Vennela's father(D.S.Deekshithulu) visits Kalyan's restaurant to ask for help, saying that the gang abducted Vennela as threatened because Kalyan did not repay her debt. The gang now threatens to kill her if he cannot repay the debt the next day. Kalyan agrees again to repay the money, to save Vennela.

The next day, Kalyan escapes from his wedding to save Vennela. He and Vennela's father arrive at the appointed place, where they see the gang pointing a gun at blindfolded Vennela. Immediately after Kalyan hands over the money to them, the police arrive on the scene. The gang is angered and thinks Kalyan brings not only the money, but the also police, so they shoot Vennela's father, hit Kalyan until he is unconscious, and take away Vennela. Before leaving, they threatened Kalyan they will kill Vennela if he tells anything to police. Kalyan wakes up later at the same place to find nobody beside him, not even Vennela's father's dead body or the police, making him very confused. Upon returning to his wedding, an upset Anu says that she should have already learned that Kalyan did not agree to marry her out of his own choice, but only as an obligation to please his mother. She starts to hate him.

Kalyan later sees the news that Vennela's father is killed in a car accident in Visakhapatnam, and police are calling anyone who knows him to claim his body as they cannot identify him. Kalyan is now more confused, thinking how can someone that had died in front of him die again. He visits the Vizag to find out what happened. Meanwhile, Anu also goes to the same city for a job assignment.

With the help of a police Constable Chokka Rao (Vennela Kishore) in that city, Kalyan finds Vamsi (Adarsh Balakrishna), a clay artist whose car caused the accident that killed Vennela's father. To their shock, Vamsi is blind and cannot drive. After some twists, Vamsi confesses that his girlfriend Jyothi a NRI drove his car and killed a old man. Vamsi bribed an inspector with three million rupees to save Jyothi, who later left him out of fear. They somehow find a photo of Jyothi but are all shocked to learn that it is Vennela. After observing a state award for specially-abled received by Vamsi, Kalyan observes there is a common point between them (i.e. the same state award he also received earlier). He now realizes that the Vennela he knew is a con artist that swindles money, especially from blind men who received the same state award. He thought he was her lover, but now he knows that he is just one of the victims of her cons. Kalyan, Anu, and Chokka decide to get the scammer at any cost.

Then it is revealed that after Kalyan's accident Vennela left him as a failure attempt and continues her cons on others. In the shares she took large amount which makes other members angry then they plans to con her decided to cheat Kalyan again. Then they lies her going to Tirupati and executes their plan on Kalyan successfully under the planning of the person who acted as Vennela's father. However Vennela finds out the whole thing and decided to kill him. In the disguise of Jyothi she believes him to make a fake accident but instead of to hit a scare crow she tactically kills him and executes her plan successfully takes over control on whole gang and escapes with them.

Finally, they catch her when she is executing her new plan, where she is cheating another blind man called Shekar (Ravi Prakash), a famous classical singer in Vijayawada as Katyayani in disguise of a Sitar player, by saying that her brother urgently needs 2.5 million rupees for a kidney transplant. Vennela observes the trio and tries to misguide them, which makes a lot of chaos, and finally, they arrest her. It is then revealed that Vennela, whose real name is Kalavathi, is a child abuse victim by her father. She later turned into a fraudster. At court, she is found guilty but mentally ill. The court sentences her to three years in jail but sends her to a mental hospital due to her mental illness. Later, Chokka Rao gets promoted to Sub-Inspector, and Kalyan and Anu also reunite after the former finally learns how much the latter loves him. Finally, the film ends with a twist that Kalavathi is not mentally ill, and she was waiting for a chance to restart her fraudulent ways again.

Cast

 Aadhi Pinisetty as Kalyan, a blind Chef
 Taapsee Pannu as Kalavathi/Vennela/Jyothi/Madhu/Katyayani, the main antagonist
 Ritika Singh as Anu
 Vennela Kishore as Constable Chokka Rao, later promoted to Sub-Inspector 
 Tulasi as Kalyan's mother
 Sivaji Raja as Kalyan's father
 Aadarsh Balakrishna as Vamsi, a blind sculptor
 Srikanth Iyyengar as Anu's father
 Satya Krishnan as Anu's mother
 Saptagiri as "Janaganamana" Jagadish, an ethical hacker and a staunch patriot.
 Viva Harsha as Kalyan's friend
 Sivannarayana Naripeddi as Hotel Manager Krishna 
 Ravi Prakash as Shekar, a blind Classical singer
 Nani cameo role as a customer in the end
 Satish Saripalli As Kalavathi's close confident. 
 D.S.Deekshithulu as Kalavathi's partner in crime.

Soundtrack 

Music is composed by Achu Rajamani & Prasan.

Reception

Critical reception 
The Times of India gave 3 out of 5 stars stating "Neevevaro isn't a lazy film by any means, just that the proceedings could have been better than a one-time watch.".

IndiaGlitz gave 2 out of 5 stars stating "'Neevevaro' doesn't have edge-of-the-seat moments.  There is a lack of urgency in the proceedings".

Hindustan Times gave 2 out of 5 stars stating "Neevevaro is a watered down version of a suspense thriller, with Vennela Kishore saving the day with his humour towards the end".

References

External links 
 

2018 films
Indian action thriller films
Telugu remakes of Tamil films
Films about blind people in India
2010s Telugu-language films
2018 action thriller films
Films about con artists
Indian thriller films
Films set in Andhra Pradesh
Films shot in Andhra Pradesh
Films set in Vijayawada
Films shot in Visakhapatnam
Films shot in Vijayawada
Films set in Visakhapatnam